Nam Su-Il (남수일, 26 June 1912 – 24 May 1972) was a South Korean male weightlifter, who competed in the featherweight class and represented South Korea at international competitions. He won the silver medal at the 1947 World Weightlifting Championships in the 60 kg category. He participated at the 1948 Summer Olympics in the 60 kg event and at the 1952 Summer Olympics in the 60 kg event. He set three featherweight world records in 1938-40 – two in the press and one in the total.

References

External links
 

1912 births
1972 deaths
South Korean male weightlifters
World Weightlifting Championships medalists
Olympic weightlifters of South Korea
Weightlifters at the 1948 Summer Olympics
Weightlifters at the 1952 Summer Olympics
World record setters in weightlifting
20th-century South Korean people